Sandman Midnight Theatre is the title of a one-shot comic book in which two DC comics characters called the Sandman —  Dream and Wesley Dodds — encounter each other. Sandman Midnight Theatre was co-written by Sandman Mystery Theatre author Matt Wagner (co-plot) and The Sandman author Neil Gaiman (co-plot/script), and featured painted artwork by Teddy Kristiansen and lettering by Todd Klein. In 1996, it received the Comics Buyer's Guide Fan Award for Favorite Original Graphic Novel/Album of 1995.

Publication history 
Sandman Midnight Theatre was published with a cover date of September 1995.  The following issue of The Sandman'''s regular series was #72, in which Dodds appeared out of costume as an epilogue to the events in this book.  Chronologically, The Sandman #72 happened long after Sandman Midnight Theatre, which occurred during Dream's imprisonment. In terms of Sandman Mystery Theatre, Sandman Midnight Theatre occurs between the storylines "The Python" and "The Mist" (between issues #36 and #37).

 Plot 
Following the events of "The Python," Dian Belmont left New York City for London.  Dodds uses a murder case as an excuse to follow her, and he finds her working at a church's soup kitchen.  While Belmont deliberately avoids Dodds, both end up, for different reasons, at a party held by Roderick Burgess, the man who imprisoned Dream in his cellar.

 Collected editions 
The graphic novel was reprinted in the 1999 anthology, Neil Gaiman's Midnight Days''.

References 

1995 comics debuts
Fantasy comics
Vertigo Comics titles
The Sandman (comic book)
Comics by Matt Wagner
Comics by Neil Gaiman
Gothic comics